Nicolò Donà or Nicolò Donato (28 January 1539 – 8 May 1618) was the 93rd Doge of Venice, reigning for little more than a month, from his election on 5 April 1618 until his death.

Biography 
The son of Giovanni Donà and Isabetta Morosini, Donato was born in Venice and studied for a time in Padua before going into trade.  He gained a huge fortune, but remained stingy his entire life.  He never married, and ultimately left his fortune to his brother Francesco and nephew Pietro.

Donato proved unwilling to spend the vast sums of money required to gain high office in the Republic of Venice.  However, in 1617–1618, the Spanish Ambassador to Venice, Alfonso de la Cueva, 1st Marquis of Bedmar launched a plot to destabilize the Venetian Republic in order to allow Spanish troops to take over Venice.  In the midst of this crisis, the reigning Doge, Giovanni Bembo, died on 16 March 1618.

Donato was elected doge on 5 April 1618, probably by paying bribes.  He tried to eliminate his reputation for stinginess by throwing the traditional lavish banquet to celebrate his election, but this proved unavailing when his parents turned a number of his relatives away from the feast in order to save money.

He died in Venice 35 days after his election, with the Bedmar Conspiracy still raging.

References 

This article is based on this article from Italian Wikipedia.

1539 births
1618 deaths
16th-century Italian nobility
17th-century Italian nobility
17th-century Doges of Venice